Dhiraj Mishra is an Indian screenwriter and playwright on movies such as Jai Jawaan Jai Kisaan.

Career 
Mishra worked as a freelance journalist for magazines and newspapers. He was the creative writer for various TV serials. He wrote a feature film screenplay based on the life of Indian Prime Minister Lal Bahadur Shastri titled Jai Jawaan Jai Kisaan.  His upcoming movies are Birsa, about a freedom fighter from Jharkhand and Chapekar brothers, a revolutionary story about freedom fighters from Pune. Om Puri was to play Bal Gangadhar Tilak.

Mishra wrote a novel Patjhar aur Bahar. He wrote a play on the life of India’s first woman Prime Minister Indira Gandhi titled Indira.

Filmography

( as writer)

 Jai Jawaan Jai Kisaan 
 Chapekar Brothers (Movie)
 Main Khudiram Bose Hun
 Gaalib
 Deendayal Ek Yugpurush
 Hero of Nation Chandra Shekhar Azad
 Alingan

Awards

 Special Award As Writer for Jai Jawaan Jai Kisaan at International Film Festival of Prayag 2015.

References

External links
 
 

1979 births
Living people
Indian male screenwriters
Hindi screenwriters
Writers from Allahabad
Screenwriters from Uttar Pradesh